Karava is a Sinhalese speaking ethnic group of Sri Lanka, whose ancestors from ancient times migrated from the Coromandel coast, claiming lineage to the Kaurava royalty of the old Kingdom of Kuru in Northern India. The Tamil equivalent is Karaiyar. Both groups are also known as the Kurukula (Kuru clan).

The last mass migration to Sri Lanka happened in the 15th century from Tamil Nadu to fight against the Mukkuvar confederation as mentioned in the Mukkara Hatana. They have also given great importance to trade and commerce. The elite families are involved in entrepreneurial activities including the development of plantation agriculture such as coconut, tea and rubber.

Etymology 
The origins of the term Karava are still debated. The name might be a modified version of the Tamil Karaiyar, where "Karava" has the same root word kara or karai meaning "coast" or "shore" in Tamil. The name "Karava" has also been proposed to be a corruption of the Sanskrit name Kaurava, following their origin story.

The first recorded instance is the Abhayagiri vihara terrace inscription dating from the 1st century BC denoting a Dameda karava navika which means Tamil Karava sailor. Other historical counts refer to them and also the Karaiyars as Careas and Kaurawar.

History 

Many Kurukula communities throughout Sri Lanka and south India claim an origin from the Kuru kingdom and the Kauravas of the Hindu epic Mahabharata. For instance, Kurukulattaraiyan was the name ascribed to  'the prince who wore a golden anklet' that commanded the army of Vijayabahu I (11th century AD) to end Chola rule in Sri Lanka.

Historical manuscripts such as the Mukkara Hatana indicate that there were migrations from the Kurumandalam coast of Tamil Nadu, South India, and that they were originally Tamil speakers. The Karavas north of Negombo are predomanantly Catholic and bilingual in Tamil and Sinhalese, whereas the Karavas south of Colombo are Buddhist. It is evident that they had also patronised Mahayana Buddhism before its extinction in the Island. 

The Mukkara Hatana describes that they won a three month siege against the Mukkuvars, under the sponsorship of Kotte king Parakramabahu VI in the 14th century AD. The Kotte King Bhuvanaikabahu VI was the son of a Karava chief who was adopted by Parakramabahu VI after the death of his father in the war mentioned in Mukkara Hatana. The Rajavaliya mentions that in the 16th century, the heirs to the throne - Bhuvanaikabahu and Pararajasinghe were under the care of the minister Karunadhipati, the Patabenda of Yapa-Patuna.

The Karava chieftains resisted the colonial Portuguese rule in 16th century. The Karava Prince of Uva, Kuruvita Rala (also known as Antonio Barreto), who had his strongholds in Batticaloa, Wellawaya, Negombo and parts of Sabaragamuwa and Matara region, led his and the troops of Sitawaka Kingdom and revolted against the Portuguese. Kuruvita Rala also raided the Kandy Kingdom and drove king Senarat of Kandy out of his capital.

They were under Portuguese rule, along with the Karaiyar and Nair recruited as Lascarins and were converted to Catholicism. Large Catholic Karava communities exists ever since, who were mostly Hindus prior to conversion. The Catholic Karava chieftains sided with the Kingdom of Kandy and the kingdom's Dutch allies against the Portuguese empire, and the King bestowed honors and titles to the Karava chieftains.

The Karavas amassed wealth through commercial ventures such as in coastal navigation, fishing, carpentry, transportation, arrack, coconut, rubber, graphite and other industries. The Karavas formed the elites between 16th century and early 20th century. Numerous organization were formed by them such as Ceylon National Association, one of the predecessors of the Ceylon National Congress. James Peiris, a Karava lawyer and national leader, was an essential character in the Sri Lankan independence movement. Rohana Wijeweera and other Karava leaders formed in the 1960s the Janatha Vimukthi Peramuna, a communist party and political movement, who were involved in two armed uprisings against the ruling governments in 1971 and 1987.

Traditional status 
The Karavas were coastal people, who served in naval warfare and contributed as coastal chieftains and regional kings. Their chiefs were referred in Sinhalese as Patabendi or Patangatim, which is derived from the Tamil term Pattamkattiyar (meaning "crowned one"), which was also used by their equivalent Tamil Karaiyars.The Karavas were one of the few Sri Lankan communities traditionally entitled to use flags. A large number of these Karava flags have survived the ravages of time and many are illustrated in E. W. Perera's book Sinhalese Banners and Standards.

The sacred usage of conch shell and tying of Nalapata (royal forehead plate) was a common practice among Karavas, also mentioned in the Rajaveliya. The sun and the moon, pearl umbrella are traditional royal symbols used by the Karavas. The Makara, being an emblem of their clan, is the mount of their clan deity, the sea god Varuna. The clan name Warnakulasuriya, denotes their deity Varuna. 

Insignia such as the pearl umbrella, flags, swords, trident, yak tail whisks, lighted flame torches and drums were previously widely used by the Karavas at their weddings and funerals. By the 1960s, such usage has been greatly reduced, whereas some places is it still practiced.

Ancestral names 
The Karava's use the  naming system. Vasagama, literally meaning "estate (gama) in which one resides", is a title or surname that is given to the patrilineal descendants. The most common clans among the Karavas are Kurukulasuriya, Warunakulasuriya and Mihindikulasuriya (formerly known as Arasakulasuriya). Other clans are Koon Karavas and Konda Karavas.

Name based on leadership or armoured military office (Sannaddha/Sannadi) include Hennadige, show a traditional military heritage and confirms the military origins of the group as claimed by Karava origin stories and family histories. Some of the popular surnames, Wachchi Hennadige, Weera Hennadige, Andra Hennadige and Warusa Hennadige , Arasa Marakkalage ("house of the Royal Mariners"), Patabendige ("house of the local headmen"), and Thantrige (also Tantulage or Thanthulage, "house of experts").

Names based on profession include Marakkalage (house of the ship/boat owners or sailors ) and Vaduge (also Baduge; house of carpenters, ship, Silmaguruge & boat builders, also descendant of Vadugar).

See also 
Caste in Sri Lanka
Bharatakula
Negombo Tamils
Kastane

References 

RAGHAVAN, M. D., The Karava of Ceylon: Society and Culture, K. V. G. de Silva, 1961.
Caste Conflict and Elite Formation, The Rise of the Karava Elite in Sri Lanka 1500–1931. Michael Roberts 1982, Cambridge, Cambridge University Press. 
Social Change in Nineteenth Century Ceylon. Patrick Peebles. 1995, Navrang .

External links 

Karava web site – Kshatriya Maha Sabha Sri Lanka
Karava – the blue-blooded Kshatriyas 
The Maha Oruwa (The Last in the tradition of the Indigenous Sailing Ships): plate 5
The Bala (Power) Oruwa: world's fastest traditional sailing canoe

Sinhalese castes